Here with Me is the second full-length studio album released by Mercury Nashville recording artist Holly Williams. The album was released on June 16, 2009, and features the singles "Keep the Change" (which reached #53 on the Hot Country Songs chart), and "Mama" (which debuted and peaked at #55).

Content
The album features eleven songs in which Williams wrote or co-wrote eight of the songs. The first single released from the album was "Keep the Change". It debuted at number 56 on the Billboard Hot Country Songs chart for the chart week of March 21, 2009. The single spent 7 weeks on the chart, reaching number 53. The second single released from the album was "Mama". The single was released on May 11, 2009 and peaked at number 55.

Justin Niebank produced the album, with assistance by Tony Brown and Williams on the tracks "Alone" and "Gone with the Morning Sun."

Track listing
"He's Making a Fool Out of You" (Chuck Jones, Holly Williams) – 3:56
"Mama" (Williams) – 2:52
"I Hold On" (Chris Janson, Williams) – 2:45
duet with Chris Janson
"Keep the Change" (Luke Laird, Hillary Lindsey) – 3:33
"Let Her Go" (Marcus Hummon, Williams) – 3:31
"Three Days in Bed" (Williams) – 2:50
"Alone" (Williams) – 4:25
"A Love I Think Will Last" (Janson, Williams) – 2:50
duet with Chris Janson
"Gone With the Morning Sun" (Tom Bukovac, Sarah Buxton, Greg Vorobiov) – 3:38
"Without Jesus Here with Me" (Williams) – 3:25
"Birds" (Neil Young) – 2:34

Personnel
 Tom Bukovac – acoustic guitar, electric guitar
 Gary Burnette – baritone guitar
 Sarah Buxton – background vocals
 J.T. Corenflos – electric guitar
 Chad Cromwell – drums
 James DiGirolamo – piano
 Dan Dugmore – acoustic guitar, steel guitar
 Kenny Greenberg – electric guitar
 Tony Harrell – Fender Rhodes, Hammond organ
 Mark Hill – bass guitar
 Marcus Hummon – acoustic guitar, piano
 Chris Janson – harmonica and duet vocals on "I Hold On" and "A Love I Think Will Last"
 Doug Lancio – electric guitar
 Hillary Lindsey – background vocals
 Chris McHugh – drums
 Steve Nathan – keyboards
 Caryl Mack Parker – background vocals
 Michael Rhodes – bass guitar
 Gordie Sampson – piano
 Holly Williams – acoustic guitar, lead vocals
 Glenn Worf – bass guitar
 Jonathan Yudkin – fiddle, mandolin

Chart performance

References

Holly Williams albums
2009 albums
Mercury Nashville albums